The 1997 season was Molde's 22nd season in the top flight of Norwegian football. This season Molde competed in Tippeligaen and the Norwegian Cup.

In Tippeligaen, Molde finished in 4th position, 16 points behind winners Rosenborg. 

Molde participated in the 1998 Norwegian Cup. They were knocked out in the second round by Stryn with the score 0-1.

Squad

As of end of season.

Friendlies

Competitions

Tippeligaen

Results summary

Positions by round

Results

League table

Norwegian Cup

Squad statistics

Appearances and goals

               

|-
|colspan="14"|Players away from Molde on loan:
|-
|colspan="14"|Players who left Molde during the season:

|}

Goalscorers

See also
Molde FK seasons

References

External links
nifs.no

1997
Molde